Makka Umarovna Sagaipova (born February 14, 1987 in Grozny, Chechen-Ingush ASSR, Soviet Union) is a Chechen singer.

Biography
She is the daughter of accordion player Umar Sagaipov. Since Sagaipova was six years of age, she began to sing, and when she was eight, she learned to dance in the Chechen youth ensemble Lovzar. Makka's career was largely sponsored by Chechen millionaire Malik Saidullaev.

Discography
Со хьа йоI ю – Нохчийчоь So ẋa yoj yu – Noxçiyçö (I am your Daughter, Chechnya)
Даймохк Daymoxk (Fatherland)
Вола Wola (Waiting For You To Come)
Ловзар Lowzar (Play)
Безам Bezam (Love)
Мавлид Mawlid (Mawlid)
Шийла мох Şiyla mox (Cold Wind)
Бабийн кIант Babiyn khant (Mother's Son)
Iаржи бIаргаш Jarƶi bjärgaş (Black Eyes)
Денош Denoş (Days)
Sa Gat Del (Soul Burns)
Люблю тебя (I Love You)
ГIургIезаш Ġurġezaş (Cranes)
ЦайогIиту Cayoġitu (They Don't Let Me Go)
Хаза кIант Xaza khant (Pretty Boy)
Сатийсар Satiysar
Хаза йоI Xaza yoj (Pretty Girl)
Хьабиби Ẋabibi (My Darling)
Ревнивый Кавказ (The Jealous Caucasus)
Кийра цIелетта Kiyra ċeletta
Са ойла хьоца ю Sa oyla ẋoca yu (My Thoughts are with you)
Хьоца Бен Дахар дац Ẋoca Ben Daxar dac (I can't Continue Without you)
Сирла седа Sirla seda
Ахь дIа Хаита Aẋ dja Xaita

External links
Chechen history, traditions, songs 
Website of Chechen Entertainment – Makka MP3's 

1987 births
Living people
Chechen women singers
Chechen people
Chechen pop singers
People from Grozny
Russian Muslims
Russian people of Chechen descent
Russian pop singers
21st-century Russian singers
21st-century Russian women singers